The 2018–19 Toronto Maple Leafs season was the 102nd season for the National Hockey League franchise that was established on November 22, 1917. The Maple Leafs forward group changed significantly before the season, losing team veterans Tyler Bozak, James van Riemsdyk and Leo Komarov while adding all-star centre John Tavares in free agency, which many publications called one of the biggest signings in NHL history. On April 1, 2019, the Maple Leafs clinched a playoff spot after a 2–1 win over the New York Islanders.

The Maple Leafs faced the Boston Bruins in the first round of the playoffs for the second straight year, where they lost in seven games.

Standings

Record vs opponents

Notes
 Game decided in overtime
 Game decided in a shootout

Schedule and results

Preseason

|- style="background:#cfc;"
| 1 || September 18 || Ottawa Senators || 4–1 ||  || McElhinney (1–0–0) || Lucan Community Memorial Centre || – || 1–0–0 || Recap
|- style="background:#cfc;"
| 2 || September 19 || @ Ottawa Senators || 4–1 ||  || Pickard (1–0–0) || Canadian Tire Centre || 11,375 || 2–0–0 || Recap
|- style="background:#cfc;"
| 3 || September 21 || Buffalo Sabres || 5–3 ||  || McElhinney (2–0–0) || Scotiabank Arena || 18,833 || 3–0–0 ||Recap
|- style="background:#cfc;"
| 4 || September 22 || @ Buffalo Sabres || 3–2 ||  || Pickard (2–0–0) || KeyBank Center || 17,624 || 4–0–0 || Recap
|- style="background:#fcc;"
| 5 || September 24 || Montreal Canadiens || 1–5 ||  || Sparks (0–1–0) || Scotiabank Arena || 18,843 || 4–1–0 || Recap
|- style="background:#cfc;"
| 6 || September 26 || @ Montreal Canadiens || 5–3 ||  || Andersen (1–0–0) || Bell Centre || 20,486 || 5–1–0 || Recap
|- style="background:#cfc;"
| 7 || September 28 || Detroit Red Wings || 6–2 ||  || Andersen (2–0–0) || Scotiabank Arena || 18,889 || 6–1–0 || Recap
|- style="background:#fcc;"
| 8 || September 29 || @ Detroit Red Wings || 1–5 ||  || McElhinney (2–1–0) || Little Caesars Arena || 18,753 || 6–2–0 || Recap
|-

Regular season

|- style="background:#cfc;"
| 1 || October 3 || Montreal Canadiens || 3–2 || OT || Andersen (1–0–0) || Scotiabank Arena || 19,589 || 1–0–0 || 2 || Recap
|- style="background:#fcc;"
| 2 || October 6 || Ottawa Senators || 3–5 || || Andersen (1–1–0) || Scotiabank Arena || 19,321 || 1–1–0 || 2 || Recap
|- style="background:#cfc;"
| 3 || October 7 || @ Chicago Blackhawks || 7–6 || OT || Sparks (1–0–0) || United Center || 21,812 || 2–1–0 || 4 || Recap
|- style="background:#cfc;"
| 4 || October 9 || @ Dallas Stars || 7–4 || || Andersen (2–1–0) || American Airlines Center || 17,866 || 3–1–0 || 6 || Recap
|- style="background:#cfc;"
| 5 || October 11 || @ Detroit Red Wings || 5–3 || || Andersen (3–1–0) || Little Caesars Arena || 19,515 || 4–1–0 || 8 || Recap
|- style="background:#cfc;"
| 6 || October 13 || @ Washington Capitals || 4–2 || || Andersen (4–1–0) || Capital One Arena || 18,506 || 5–1–0 || 10 || Recap
|- style="background:#cfc;"
| 7 || October 15 || Los Angeles Kings || 4–1 || || Sparks (2–0–0) || Scotiabank Arena || 19,429 || 6–1–0 || 12 || Recap
|- style="background:#fcc;"
| 8 || October 18 || Pittsburgh Penguins || 0–3 || || Andersen (4–2–0) || Scotiabank Arena || 19,483 || 6–2–0 || 12 || Recap
|- style="background:#fcc;"
| 9 || October 20 || St. Louis Blues || 1–4 || || Andersen (4–3–0) || Scotiabank Arena || 19,268 || 6–3–0 || 12 || Recap
|- style="background:#cfc;"
| 10 || October 24 || @ Winnipeg Jets || 4–2 || || Andersen (5–3–0) || Bell MTS Place || 15,321 || 7–3–0 || 14 || Recap
|- style="background:#cfc;"
| 11 || October 27 || Winnipeg Jets || 3–2 || || Andersen (6–3–0) || Scotiabank Arena || 19,545 || 8–3–0 || 16 || Recap
|- style="background:#fcc;"
| 12 || October 29 || Calgary Flames || 1–3 || || Andersen (6–4–0) || Scotiabank Arena || 18,989 || 8–4–0 || 16 || Recap
|-

|- style="background:#fcc;"
| 13 || November 1 || Dallas Stars || 1–2 || || Andersen (6–5–0) || Scotiabank Arena || 18,878 || 8–5–0 || 16 || Recap
|- style="background:#cfc;"
| 14 || November 3 || @ Pittsburgh Penguins || 5–0 || || Andersen (7–5–0) || PPG Paints Arena || 18,638 || 9–5–0 || 18 || Recap
|- style="background:#cfc;"
| 15 || November 6 || Vegas Golden Knights || 3–1 || || Andersen (8–5–0) || Scotiabank Arena || 19,045 || 10–5–0 || 20 || Recap
|- style="background:#cfc;"
| 16 || November 9 || New Jersey Devils || 6–1 || || Andersen (9–5–0) || Scotiabank Arena || 19,211 || 11–5–0 || 22 || Recap
|- style="background:#fcc;"
| 17|| November 10 || @ Boston Bruins || 1–5 || || Sparks (2–1–0) || TD Garden || 17,565 || 11–6–0 || 22 || Recap
|- style="background:#cfc;"
| 18 || November 13 || @ Los Angeles Kings || 5–1 || || Andersen (10–5–0) || Staples Center || 17,859 || 12–6–0 || 24 || Recap
|- style="background:#cfc;"
| 19 || November 15 || @ San Jose Sharks || 5–3 || ||  Andersen (11–5–0) || SAP Center || 17,011 || 13–6–0 || 26 || Recap
|- style="background:#cfc;"
| 20 || November 16 || @ Anaheim Ducks || 2–1 || OT || Sparks (3–1–0) || Honda Center || 16,666 || 14–6–0 || 28 || Recap
|- style="background:#cfc;"
| 21 || November 19 || Columbus Blue Jackets || 4–2 || || Andersen (12–5–0) || Scotiabank Arena || 19,134 || 15–6–0 || 30 || Recap
|- style="background:#fcc;"
| 22 || November 21 || @ Carolina Hurricanes || 2–5 || || Andersen (12–6–0) || PNC Arena || 12,562 || 15–7–0 || 30 || Recap
|- style="background:#fcc;"
| 23 || November 23 || @ Columbus Blue Jackets || 2–4 || || Andersen (12–7–0) || Nationwide Arena || 18,656 || 15–8–0 || 30 || Recap
|- style="background:#cfc;"
| 24 || November 24 || Philadelphia Flyers || 6–0 || || Sparks (4–1–0) || Scotiabank Arena || 19,373 || 16–8–0 || 32 || Recap
|- style="background:#cfc;"
| 25 || November 26 || Boston Bruins || 4–2 || || Andersen (13–7–0) || Scotiabank Arena || 19,286 || 17–8–0 || 34 || Recap
|- style="background:#cfc;"
| 26 || November 28 || San Jose Sharks || 5–3 || || Andersen (14–7–0) || Scotiabank Arena || 19,362 || 18–8–0 || 36 || Recap
|-

|- style="background:#cfc;"
| 27 || December 1 || @ Minnesota Wild || 5–3 || || Andersen (15–7–0) || Xcel Energy Center || 19,107 || 19–8–0 || 38 || Recap
|- style="background:#cfc;"
| 28 || December 4 || @ Buffalo Sabres || 4–3 || OT || Andersen (16–7–0) || KeyBank Center || 19,070 || 20–8–0 || 40 || Recap
|- style="background:#ffc;"
| 29 || December 6 || Detroit Red Wings || 4–5 || OT || Sparks (4–1–1) || Scotiabank Arena || 19,392 || 20–8–1 || 41 || Recap
|- style="background:#fcc;"
| 30 || December 8 || @ Boston Bruins || 3–6 || || Andersen (16–8–0) || TD Garden || 17,565 || 20–9–1 || 41 || Recap
|- style="background:#cfc;"
| 31 || December 11 || @ Carolina Hurricanes || 4–1 || || Andersen (17–8–0) || PNC Arena || 11,907 || 21–9–1 || 43 || Recap
|- style="background:#fcc;"
| 32 || December 13 || @ Tampa Bay Lightning || 1–4 || || Andersen (17–9–0) || Amalie Arena || 19,092 || 21–10–1 || 43 || Recap
|- style="background:#ffc;"
| 33 || December 15 || @ Florida Panthers || 3–4 || OT || Andersen (17–9–1) || BB&T Center || 14,177 || 21–10–2 || 44 || Recap
|- style="background:#cfc;"
| 34 || December 18 || @ New Jersey Devils || 7–2 || || Andersen (18–9–1) || Prudential Center || 14,586 || 22–10–2 || 46 || Recap
|- style="background:#cfc;"
| 35 || December 20 || Florida Panthers || 6–1 || || Andersen (19–9–1) || Scotiabank Arena || 19,329 || 23–10–2 || 48 || Recap
|- style="background:#cfc;"
| 36 || December 22 || New York Rangers || 5–3 || || Andersen (20–9–1) || Scotiabank Arena || 19,466 || 24–10–2 || 50 || Recap
|- style="background:#cfc;"
| 37 || December 23 || Detroit Red Wings || 5–4 || OT || Sparks (5–1–1) || Scotiabank Arena || 19,196 || 25–10–2 || 52 || Recap
|- style="background:#cfc;"
| 38 || December 28 || @ Columbus Blue Jackets || 4–2 || || Sparks (6–1–1) || Nationwide Arena || 18,963 || 26–10–2 || 54 || Recap
|- style="background:#fcc;"
| 39 || December 29 || New York Islanders || 0–4 || || Sparks (6–2–1) || Scotiabank Arena || 19,514 || 26–11–2 || 54 || Recap
|-

|- style="background:#fcc;"
| 40 || January 3 || Minnesota Wild || 3–4 || || Hutchinson (0–1–0) || Scotiabank Arena || 19,244 || 26–12–2 || 54 || Recap
|- style="background:#cfc;"
| 41 || January 5 || Vancouver Canucks || 5–0 || || Hutchinson (1–1–0) || Scotiabank Arena || 19,388 || 27–12–2 || 56 || Recap
|- style="background:#fcc;"
| 42 || January 7 || Nashville Predators || 0–4 || || Hutchinson (1–2–0) || Scotiabank Arena || 19,059 || 27–13–2 || 56 || Recap
|- style="background:#cfc;"
| 43 || January 10 || @ New Jersey Devils || 4–2 || || Hutchinson (2–2–0) || Prudential Center || 15,280 || 28–13–2 || 58 || Recap
|- style="background:#fcc;"
| 44 || January 12 || Boston Bruins || 2–3 || || Hutchinson (2–3–0) || Scotiabank Arena || 19,305 || 28–14–2 || 58 || Recap
|- style="background:#fcc;"
| 45 || January 14 || Colorado Avalanche || 3–6 || || Andersen (20–10–1) || Scotiabank Arena || 19,248 || 28–15–2 || 58 || Recap
|- style="background:#cfc;"
| 46 || January 17 || @ Tampa Bay Lightning || 4–2 || || Andersen (21–10–1) || Amalie Arena || 19,092 || 29–15–2 || 60 || Recap
|- style="background:#fcc;"
| 47 || January 18 || @ Florida Panthers || 1–3 || || Sparks (6–3–1) || BB&T Center || 16,741 || 29–16–2 || 60 || Recap
|- style="background:#fcc;"
| 48 || January 20 || Arizona Coyotes || 2–4 || || Andersen (21–11–1) || Scotiabank Arena || 19,165 || 29–17–2 || 60 || Recap
|- style="background:#cfc;"
| 49 || January 23 || Washington Capitals || 6–3 || || Andersen (22–11–1) || Scotiabank Arena || 19,148 || 30–17–2 || 62 || Recap
|-

|- style="background:#ffc;"
| 50 || February 1 || @ Detroit Red Wings || 2–3 || OT || Andersen (22–11–2) || Little Caesars Arena || 19,515 || 30–17–3 || 63 || Recap
|- style="background:#cfc;"
| 51 || February 2 || Pittsburgh Penguins || 3–2 || || Sparks (7–3–1) || Scotiabank Arena || 19,477 || 31–17–3 || 65 || Recap
|- style="background:#cfc;"
| 52 || February 4 || Anaheim Ducks || 6–1 || || Andersen (23–11–2) || Scotiabank Arena || 18,858 || 32–17–3 || 67 || Recap
|- style="background:#cfc;"
| 53 || February 6 || Ottawa Senators || 5–4 || || Andersen (24–11–2) || Scotiabank Arena || 19,264 || 33–17–3 || 69 || Recap
|- style="background:#cfc;"
| 54 || February 9 || @ Montreal Canadiens || 4–3 || OT || Andersen (25–11–2) || Bell Centre || 21,302 || 34–17–3 || 71 || Recap
|- style="background:#fcc;"
| 55 || February 10 || @ New York Rangers || 1–4 || || Sparks (7–4–1) || Madison Square Garden || 17,445 || 34–18–3 || 71 || Recap
|- style="background:#cfc;"
| 56 || February 12 || @ Colorado Avalanche || 5–2 || || Andersen (26–11–2) || Pepsi Center || 16,426 || 35–18–3 || 73 || Recap
|- style="background:#cfc;"
| 57 || February 14 || @ Vegas Golden Knights || 6–3 || || Andersen (27–11–2) || T-Mobile Arena || 18,214 || 36–18–3 || 75 || Recap
|- style="background:#fcc;"
| 58 || February 16 || @ Arizona Coyotes || 0–2 || || Andersen (27–12–2) || Gila River Arena || 17,125 || 36–19–3 || 75 || Recap
|- style="background:#ffc;"
| 59 || February 19 || @ St. Louis Blues || 2–3 || OT || Andersen (27–12–3) || Enterprise Center || 18,598 || 36–19–4 || 76 || Recap
|- style="background:#fcc;"
| 60 || February 21 || Washington Capitals || 2–3 || || Andersen (27–13–3) || Scotiabank Arena || 19,378 || 36–20–4 || 76 || Recap
|- style="background:#cfc;"
| 61 || February 23 || Montreal Canadiens || 6–3 || || Andersen (28–13–3) || Scotiabank Arena || 19,506 || 37–20–4 || 78 || Recap
|- style="background:#cfc;"
| 62 || February 25 || Buffalo Sabres || 5–3 || || Andersen (29–13–3) || Scotiabank Arena || 19,026 || 38–20–4 || 80 || Recap
|- style="background:#cfc;"
| 63 || February 27 || Edmonton Oilers || 6–2 || || Andersen (30–13–3) || Scotiabank Arena || 19,356 || 39–20–4 || 82 || Recap
|- style="background:#fcc;"
| 64 || February 28 || @ New York Islanders || 1–6 || || Sparks (7–5–1) || Nassau Coliseum || 13,917 || 39–21–4 || 82 || Recap
|-

|- style="background:#cfc;"
| 65 || March 2 || Buffalo Sabres || 5–2 || || Andersen (31–13–3) || Scotiabank Arena || 19,088 || 40–21–4 || 84 || Recap
|- style="background:#cfc;"
| 66 || March 4 || @ Calgary Flames || 6–2 || || Andersen (32–13–3) || Scotiabank Saddledome || 19,289 || 41–21–4 || 86 || Recap
|- style="background:#ffc;"
| 67 || March 6 || @ Vancouver Canucks || 2–3 || OT || Andersen (32–13–4) || Rogers Arena || 18,871 || 41–21–5 || 87 || Recap
|- style="background:#cfc;"
| 68 || March 9 || @ Edmonton Oilers || 3–2 || || Andersen (33–13–4) || Rogers Place || 18,347 || 42–21–5 || 89 || Recap
|- style="background:#fcc;"
| 69 || March 11 || Tampa Bay Lightning || 2–6 || || Andersen (33–14–4) || Scotiabank Arena || 19,491 || 42–22–5 || 89 || Recap
|- style="background:#fcc;"
| 70 || March 13 || Chicago Blackhawks || 4–5 || || Sparks (7–6–1) || Scotiabank Arena || 19,342 || 42–23–5 || 89 || Recap
|- style="background:#cfc;"
| 71 || March 15 || Philadelphia Flyers || 7–6 || || Andersen (34–14–4) || Scotiabank Arena || 19,290 || 43–23–5 || 91 || Recap
|- style="background:#fcc;"
| 72 || March 16 || @ Ottawa Senators || 2–6 || || Sparks (7–7–1) || Canadian Tire Centre || 18,607 || 43–24–5 || 91 || Recap
|- style="background:#fcc;"
| 73 || March 19 || @ Nashville Predators || 0–3 || || Andersen (34–15–4) || Bridgestone Arena || 17,499 || 43–25–5 || 91 || Recap
|- style="background:#cfc;"
| 74 || March 20 || @ Buffalo Sabres || 4–2 || || Sparks (8–7–1) || KeyBank Center || 19,070 || 44–25–5 || 93 || Recap
|- style="background:#ffc;"
| 75 || March 23 || New York Rangers || 1–2 || OT || Andersen (34–15–5) || Scotiabank Arena || 19,251 || 44–25–6 || 94 || Recap
|- style="background:#cfc;"
| 76 || March 25 || Florida Panthers || 7–5 || || Andersen (35–15–5) || Scotiabank Arena || 19,125 || 45–25–6 || 96 || Recap
|- style="background:#ffc;"
| 77 || March 27 || @ Philadelphia Flyers || 4–5 || SO || Andersen (35–15–6) || Wells Fargo Center || 19,205 || 45–25–7 || 97 || Recap
|- style="background:#fcc;"
| 78 || March 30 || @ Ottawa Senators || 2–4 || || Sparks (8–8–1) || Canadian Tire Centre || 18,655 || 45–26–7 || 97 || Recap
|-

|- style="background:#cfc;"
| 79 || April 1 || @ New York Islanders || 2–1 || || Andersen (36–15–6) || Nassau Coliseum || 13,917 || 46–26–7 || 99 || Recap
|- style="background:#fcc;"
| 80 || April 2 || Carolina Hurricanes || 1–4 || || Sparks (8–9–1) || Scotiabank Arena || 19,097 || 46–27–7 || 99 || Recap
|- style="background:#fcc;"
| 81 || April 4 || Tampa Bay Lightning || 1–3 || || Andersen (36–16–6) || Scotiabank Arena || 19,400 || 46–28–7 || 99 || Recap
|- style="background:#ffc;"
| 82 || April 6 || @ Montreal Canadiens || 5–6 || SO || Andersen (36–16–7) || Bell Centre || 21,302 || 46–28–8 || 100 || Recap
|-

|-
| 2018–19 schedule

Overtime statistics

Playoffs

The Maple Leafs faced the Boston Bruins in the First Round of the playoffs, and were defeated in seven games. They played against each other in the 2018 Stanley Cup playoffs, where the Maple Leafs lost to the Bruins in the First Round in seven games.

|- style="background:#cfc;"
| 1 || April 11 || @ Boston Bruins || 4–1 ||  || Andersen (1–0) || TD Garden || 17,565 || 1–0 || Recap
|- style="background:#fcc;"
| 2 || April 13 || @ Boston Bruins || 1–4 ||  || Andersen (1–1) || TD Garden || 17,565 || 1–1 || Recap
|- style="background:#cfc;"
| 3 || April 15 || Boston Bruins || 3–2 ||  || Andersen (2–1) || Scotiabank Arena || 19,611 || 2–1 || Recap
|- style="background:#fcc;"
| 4 || April 17 || Boston Bruins || 4–6 ||  || Andersen (2–2) || Scotiabank Arena || 19,638 || 2–2 || Recap
|- style="background:#cfc;"
| 5 || April 19 || @ Boston Bruins || 2–1 ||  || Andersen (3–2) || TD Garden || 17,565 || 3–2 || Recap
|- style="background:#fcc;"
| 6 || April 21 || Boston Bruins || 2–4 ||  || Andersen (3–3) || Scotiabank Arena || 19,683 || 3–3 || Recap
|- style="background:#fcc;"
| 7 || April 23 || @ Boston Bruins || 1–5 ||  || Andersen (3–4) || TD Garden || 17,565 || 3–4 || Recap
|-

|-
|

Player statistics
Final

Skaters

Goaltenders

(a) Player currently playing for the minor league affiliate Toronto Marlies of the AHL 
(b) Player is no longer with the Maple Leafs organization 
(c) Player previously played with another team before being acquired by Toronto
Bold/italics denotes franchise record.

Transactions
The Maple Leafs have been involved in the following transactions during the 2018–19 season.

Trades

Free agents

Waivers

Signings

Draft picks

Below are the Toronto Maple Leafs' selections at the 2018 NHL Entry Draft, which was held on June 22 and 23, 2018, at the American Airlines Center in Dallas, Texas. The Leafs drafted a total of nine players. They held on to only three (rounds 4, 5, 7) of their own seven picks. On the first day of the draft they exchanged their first-round pick for a lower first-round pick held by the St. Louis Blues but did receive the Blues' third-round pick as well, their second round pick had been traded to the Montreal Canadiens in the Tomas Plekanec deal in February 2018, their third-round pick was given to the New Jersey Devils as compensation for signing general manager Lou Lamoriello in 2015, and their sixth-round pick had been traded to the Vegas Golden Knights in the Calvin Pickard deal in October 2017. Through various trades they acquired an additional six picks, including the first-round pick originally held by St. Louis mentioned above.

Notes:
 The Winnipeg Jets' first-round pick went to the Toronto Maple Leafs as the result of a trade on June 22, 2018, that sent a first-round pick in 2018 (25th overall) to St. Louis in exchange for a third-round pick in 2018 (76th overall) and this pick.
 The San Jose Sharks' second-round pick went to the Toronto Maple Leafs as the result of a trade on February 22, 2016, that sent Roman Polak and Nick Spaling to San Jose in exchange for Raffi Torres, a second-round pick in 2017 and this pick.
 The St. Louis Blues' third-round pick went the Toronto Maple Leafs as the result of a trade on June 22, 2018, that sent a first-round pick in 2018 (25th overall) to St. Louis in exchange for Winnipeg's first-round pick in 2018 (29th overall) and this pick.
 The San Jose Sharks' third-round pick went to the Toronto Maple Leafs as the result of a trade on February 27, 2016, that sent James Reimer and Jeremy Morin to San Jose in exchange for Alex Stalock, Ben Smith and this pick (being conditional at the time of the trade).
 The Buffalo Sabres' sixth-round pick went to the Toronto Maple Leafs as the result of a trade on June 23, 2018, that sent Toronto's sixth-round pick in 2019 to Buffalo in exchange for this pick.
 The Anaheim Ducks' seventh-round pick went to the Toronto Maple Leafs as the result of a trade January 10, 2017, that sent Jhonas Enroth to Anaheim in exchange for this pick.

References

Toronto Maple Leafs seasons
Toronto Maple Leafs
Maple Leafs
2018 in Toronto
2019 in Toronto